Deaglán de Bréadún, Irish journalist and author.

Education
De Bréadún was educated at Synge Street CBS and University College, Dublin.

Work
An award-winning journalist who worked for many  years with The Irish Times where he held a range of positions including Northern Editor, Foreign Affairs Correspondent and Political Correspondent before taking early retirement at the end of 2012. Currently a columnist with the Belfast-based Irish News and a regular broadcaster in English and Irish, he also worked in 2013-14 as Local Radio Correspondent at the Oireachtas(Republic of Ireland parliament) and in 2014-15 as Political Editor of The Irish Sun.

He won the Northern Ireland IPR/BT award for Daily News Journalist of the Year and has had two books published in English, one of them on the Good Friday Agreement negotiations and their aftermath and the other on the Sinn Féin party, as well as three books in the Irish language. A native of County Wexford, he has lived most of his life in Dublin where he attended CBS Synge Street and UCD. He was a member of the Press Council of Ireland from 2013 to 2019, nominated by the National Union of Journalists and serving the maximum period of two three-year terms.

Publications
The Far Side of Revenge: Making Peace in Northern Ireland (2001, second edition 2008)
Power Play: The Rise of Modern Sinn Féin (2015)
Sceallóga (Chips, 1990, a collection of short stories)
Cinnlínte: Saol an Iriseora (Headlines: The Journalist's Life, 2016, a memoir)
''Scéalta Nuachta ("News Stories", 2016, a collection of articles in Irish).

References

External links
 Deaglán de Bréadún – Political Journalist, interviewswithinterestingpeople.com
 Deaglán De Bréadún, Seán MacDiarmada Summer School
 Deaglán De Bréadún, Palestine: Information with Provenance (PIWP database)

20th-century Irish people
21st-century Irish people
Irish journalists
Irish writers
Irish-language writers
People educated at Synge Street CBS